The following is a partial list of notable Weber State University people. It includes alumni, professors, and others associated with Weber State University.

Principals and presidents

Alumni

Business
 Nolan D. Archibald - Former CEO of Black & Decker
 Bryan Brandenburg - Co-founder of Salt Lake Comic Con, Executive Producer Engineering Animation, Inc., Co-Founder of Sculptured Software
  Kevin Carmony - CEO of  Linspire, Inc.  - Outstanding Graduate (School of Business, 1983)
 Alan Hall - Founder and Former Chairman of MarketStar Corporation and Founder of Grow Utah Ventures
 Dee Hock - Creator of Visa Credit Card
 Nolan Karras - Non-executive member of the board of directors of Scottish Power
 J. Willard Marriott - Founder of Marriott International
 Barry Mower - Founder of Lifetime Products
  Chad Olson - CFO of  Linspire, Inc.
 Robert Dotson - Former CEO of T-Mobile USA
 Steve Starks - CEO of Larry H. Miller Group and Former President of Utah Jazz
 Alan W. Stock - Former CEO of Cinemark Theatres
 Jerry Moyes - Founder of Swift Transportation now part of Knight-Swift (NYSE:KNX) and former owner of the Phoenix Coyotes of the National Hockey League

Education
 Fawn M. Brodie - Historian and author
 Marilyn Arnold - emeritus professor of English at Brigham Young University

Entertainment
 Bill Allred - Radio Personality and host of Radio from Hell
 Paul W. Draper - mentalist and Anthropologist

Government
 Mark Evans Austad - Former Ambassador to Finland and Ambassador to Norway
 Lynn Jenkins - former Kansas state legislator and Kansas State Treasurer, and current U.S. Congresswoman from Kansas's 2nd congressional district.
 David M. Kennedy - Former United States Secretary of the Treasury
 Jill Parrish - Associate Justice of the Utah Supreme Court
 Richard Richards - Former Chair of the Republican National Committee under President Ronald Reagan.
 Richard H. Stallings - Former member United States House of Representatives
 Olene S. Walker - Utah State Governor/ First female to hold position.
 Greg Bell - Lieutenant Governor of Utah

Military
 George E. Wahlen - Medal of Honor Recipient George E. Wahlen
 Brian Miles Thacker - Medal of Honor Recipient

Religion
 Heber C. Jentzsch - President of the Church of Scientology International
 Boyd K. Packer - President of the Quorum of the Twelve Apostles of the Church of Jesus Christ of Latter-day Saints

Sports
 Robb Akey - college football head coach - Idaho Vandals
 Lance Allred - Professional basketball player and former NBA player, Cleveland Cavaliers
 Harold Arceneaux - Professional basketball player
 Larry Bergh - former ABA basketball player
 Mark Brewer - former NBA player for the Syracuse Nationals
 Jeff Carlson- Former NFL player
 Charles Clinger - second highest High Jump in the world from 2001-03
 Bob Davis - Former NBA basketball player
 J.D. Folsom - Former NFL linebacker, for the Miami Dolphins
 Eddie Gill - Former NBA point guard for the NBA Indiana Pacers
 Halvor Hagen - NFL Offensive lineman, for the Buffalo Bills
 David Hale - Former NFL Offensive lineman, for the Baltimore Ravens
 Rob Hitchcock - Former CFL player, Hamilton Tiger-Cats, Edmonton Eskimos
 Ben Howland - college basketball head coach - UCLA Bruins
 Dick Hunsaker - college basketball head coach - Utah Valley University
 Taron Johnson — NFL Defensive Back for the Buffalo Bills
 Damian Lillard - NBA guard for the Portland Trail Blazers and unanimous 2012-13 NBA Rookie of the Year.
 Al Lolotai - NFL Offensive lineman, for the Washington Redskins
 Marcus Mailei - Former NFL Fullback, for the New Orleans Saints
 Jamie Martin - Former NFL quarterback, 1991 Walter Payton Award
 Ken McEachern- Former CFL Defensive Back for the Saskatchewan Roughriders and the Toronto Argonauts; All-Star in 1980-81, won the 1983 Grey Cup with the Argonauts, awarded the Tom Pate Memorial Award
 Court McGee - wrestler; professional mixed martial artist, Won The Ultimate Fighter 11, UFC Welterweight
 Pat McQuistan - NFL Offensive lineman, for the Dallas Cowboys
 Paul McQuistan - NFL Offensive lineman, for the Seattle Seahawks
 Ruben Nembhard - Former NBA basketball player
 Paul Pilkington - Former world class marathon runner. Major marathon wins include '90 Houston and '96 Los Angeles
 Darryl Pollard - Former NFL player Cornerback, for the San Francisco 49ers
 Alfred Pupunu - Former NFL football player. Scored touchdown in Super Bowl XXIX for the San Diego Chargers
 Roger Ruzek - NFL placekicker, for the Dallas Cowboys
 Cam Quayle - 1998 NFL Draft Mr. Irrelevant.
 Bill Schuffenhauer - 3x Olympian, competed in 2002/2006/2010 Olympics and took silver in the 2002 Winter Olympics in Park City, UT in bobsleigh for Team USA.
 Bo Smith - CFL Cornerback, for the Hamilton Tiger-Cats
 John L. Smith - college football head coach at Arkansas, Michigan State, Louisville, Utah State, & Idaho
 Bob Sneddon - NFL cornerback, for the Washington Redskins
 Willie Sojourner - Former NBA/ABA basketball player
 Dan Sparks - Former NBA/ABA basketball player
 Chris Sulages, college football coach
 Justus Thigpen - Former NBA/ABA basketball player
 John Thompson - Former NFL Tight End, for the Green Bay Packers
 Tim Toone - 2010 Mr. Irrelevant* NFL Wide Receiver, member of the Atlanta Falcons
 Dimitri Tsoumpas - CFL Offensive lineman, for the Calgary Stampeders
 Lee White - Former NFL player
 Greg Whisman - Former PGA Tour player, 1991-1993.

References